This is a partial list of professional and semi-professional theaters in Nepal.

Aarohan Gurukul
Sarwanam Theatre Group

References 

Nepal
Theatre companies in Nepal
Performing arts venues in Nepal
theatres
theatres